The 2019–20 season was Milton Keynes Dons' 16th season in their existence, and the club's first season back in League One following promotion from League Two at the end of the 2018–19 season. Along with competing in League One, the club also competed in the FA Cup, EFL Cup and EFL Trophy.

Fixtures were suspended on 13 March 2020 due to the COVID-19 pandemic. Clubs later voted to end the season prematurely with immediate effect on 9 June 2020, with the final table decided upon by an unweighted points-per-game system resulting in the club finishing the season in 19th place.

The season covered the period from 1 July 2019 to 30 June 2020.

Competitions

League One

Final table

Source: Sky Sports

Matches

FA Cup

Matches

EFL Cup

Matches

EFL Trophy

Southern Group G Table

Matches

Player details
 Note: Players' ages as of the club's opening fixture of the 2019–20 season.

Transfers

Transfers in

Transfers out

Loans in

Loans out

Awards
EFL League One Player of the Month (December 2019): Alex Gilbey

References

External links

Official Supporters Association website
MK Dons news on MKWeb

Milton Keynes Dons
Milton Keynes Dons F.C. seasons